Fodé Kuffour Camara (born 17 August 1988) is a Guinean footballer who currently plays as a defender for Guinea's national team.

References

External links
 
 Fodé Camara at Footballdatabase

1988 births
Living people
Guinean footballers
Guinea international footballers
2015 Africa Cup of Nations players
Horoya AC players
Al-Nahda Club (Saudi Arabia) players
Saudi First Division League players
Expatriate footballers in Saudi Arabia
Guinean expatriates in Saudi Arabia
Association football defenders